HD 192699 b is an exoplanet  located approximately 214 light-years away in the constellation of Aquila, orbiting the star HD 192699. This planet was discovered in April 2007, massing at least 2.5 times the mass of Jupiter. Despite its orbital distance more than that of Earth, the orbital period is less than a year, because the parent star is more massive than the Sun.

The planet HD 192699 b is named Khomsa. The name was selected in the NameExoWorlds campaign by Tunisia, during the 100th anniversary of the IAU. Khomsa is a palm-shaped amulet that is popular in Tunisia.

The existence of this planet around a 1.68 solar mass star provides evidence for the existence of planetary systems around A-type main sequence stars.

See also
 HD 175541 b
 HD 210702 b

References

External links
 

Exoplanets discovered in 2007
Giant planets
Aquila (constellation)
Exoplanets detected by radial velocity
Exoplanets with proper names